Milano Quarto Oggiaro is a surface suburban railway station in the Quarto Oggiaro district in Milan, Italy.

Services 
The station is served by lines S1 and S3 of the Milan suburban railway service, operated by the Lombard railway company Trenord.

The station is located on Via Carlo Amoretti.

See also
Railway stations in Milan
Milan suburban railway service

References

External links

 Ferrovienord official site - Milano Quarto Oggiaro railway station 

Quarto Oggiaro
Ferrovienord stations
Milan S Lines stations